Rurki is a town located in the Punjab province of Pakistan. It is located in Lahore District at 31°11'0N 73°11'0E with an altitude of 175 metres (577 feet). Neighbouring settlements include Ghator and Kot Rajput.

References

Populated places in Lahore District